In typography, the point is the smallest unit of measure. It is used for measuring font size, leading, and other items on a printed page. The size of the point has varied throughout printing's history. Since the 18th century, the size of a point has been between 0.18 and 0.4 millimeters. Following the advent of desktop publishing in the 1980s and 1990s, digital printing has largely supplanted the letterpress printing and has established the DTP point (DeskTop Publishing point) as the de facto standard.

In metal type, the point size of the font describes the height of the metal body on which the typeface's characters were cast. In digital type, letters of a font are designed around an imaginary space called an em square. When a point size of a font is specified, the font is scaled so that its em square has a side length of that particular length in points. Although the letters of a font usually fit within the font's em square, there is not necessarily any size relationship between the two, so the point size does not necessarily correspond to any measurement of the size of the letters on the printed page.

History 
The point was first established by the Milanese typographer, Francesco Torniella da Novara ( – 1589) in his 1517 alphabet, L'Alfabeto. The construction of the alphabet is the first based on logical measurement called "Punto," which corresponds to the ninth part of the height of the letters or the thickness of the principal stroke.

Notations
A measurement in points can be represented in three different ways. For example, 14 points (1 pica plus 2 points) can be written:

  (12 points would be just "")—traditional style
 1p2 (12 points would be just "1p")—format for desktop
 14pt (12 points would be "12pt" or "1pc" since it is the same as 1 pica)—format used by Cascading Style Sheets defined by the World Wide Web Consortium.

Varying standards 

There have been many definitions of a "point" since the advent of typography.

French points 

It was invented by the French clergyman Sébastien Truchet. During the metrication of France amid its revolution, a 1799 law declared the meter to be exactly 443.296 French lines long. It has also been cited as exactly 0.188 mm.

The Fournier point was established by Pierre Simon Fournier in 1737. The system of Fournier was based on a different French foot of c. 298 mm. With the usual convention that 1 foot equals 12 inches, 1 inch (pouce) was divided into 12 lines (lignes) and 1 line was further divided into 6 typographic points (points typographiques). 1 point Fournier = 0.0135 English inches.

Fournier printed a reference scale of 144 points over two inches; however, it was too rough to accurately measure a single point.

The Didot point, established by François-Ambroise Didot in 1783, was an attempt to improve the Fournier system. Accordingly, one Didot point is exactly two Truchet points.

In Belgium the Fournier system was used until the 1970s and later. It was called the "mediaan"-system. To avoid confusion between the new and the old sizes, Didot also rejected the traditional names, thus parisienne became corps 5, nonpareille became corps 6, and so on. The Didot system prevailed because the French government demanded printing in Didot measurements.

The Fournier point did not achieve lasting popularity despite being revived by the Monotype Corporation in 1927. It was still a standard in Belgium, in parts of Austria, and in Northern France at the beginning of the 20th century.

Other European points 

Approximations were subsequently employed, largely owing to the Didot point's unwieldy conversion to metric units (the divisor of its conversion ratio has the prime factorization of ).

A more precise number, sometimes is given; this is used by TeX as the  unit. This has become the standard in Germany and Central and Eastern Europe. This size is still mentioned in the technical regulations of the Eurasian Economic Union.

Metric points 

 
The symbol Q is used in Japanese after the initial letter of quarter millimeter. Due to demand by Japanese typesetters, CSS adopted Q in 2015.

ISO 128 specifies preferred line thicknesses for technical drawings and ISO 9175 specifies respective pens. The steps between nominal sizes are based on a factor of √2 ≈ 1.414 in order to match ISO 216 paper sizes. Since the set of sizes includes thicknesses of 0.1 mm, 0.5 mm, 1 mm and 2 mm, there is also one of 0.35 mm which is almost exactly 1 pica point. In other words, 2−1.5 mm =  mm approximates an English typographic point rather well.

American points 
The basic unit of measurements in American typography was the pica, usually approximated as one sixth of an inch, but the exact size was not standardized, and various type foundries had been using their own.

After the American war of Independence Benjamin Franklin was sent as commissioner (Ambassador) for the United States to France (December 1776 to 1785).  While living there he had intimate contact with the Fournier family, including the father and Pierre Simon Fournier. Franklin wanted to teach his grandson Benjamin Franklin Bache about printing and typefounding, and arranged for him to be trained by Francois Ambroise Didot. Franklin then imported French typefounding equipment to Philadelphia to help Bache set up a type-foundry. Around 1790, Bache published a specimen sheet with some Fournier types. After the death of Franklin, the matrices and the Fournier mould were acquired by Binny and Ronaldson, the first permanent type-foundry in America. Successive mergers and acquisitions in 1833, 1860 and 1897 saw the company eventually become known as MacKellar, Smith & Jordan. The Fournier cicero mould was used by them to cast pica-sized type.

Nelson Hawks proposed, like Fournier, to divide one American inch exactly into six picas, and one pica into 12 points. However, this saw an opposition because the majority of foundries had been using picas less than one sixth of an inch. So in 1886, after some examination of various picas, the Type Founders Association of the United States approved the pica of the L. Johnson & Co. foundry of Philadelphia (hence the Johnson pica) as the most established. The company went on to become MacKellar, Smiths, & Jordan Co. and was finally acquired by the Type Founders Association. That means 6 picas or 72 points constitute  standard inches. A less precise definition is one pica equals , and one point . It was also noticed that 83 picas is nearly equal to 35 cm, so the Type Founders Association also suggested using a 35 cm metal rod for measurements, but this was not accepted by every foundry.

This has become known as the American point system. The British foundries accepted this in 1898.

Old English points

Although the English Monotype manuals used 1 pica = .1660 inch, the manuals used on the European continent use another definition: there 1 pica = .1667 inch, the Old English pica.

As a consequence all the tables of measurements in the German, Dutch, French, Polish and all other manuals elsewhere on the European continent for the composition caster and the super-caster are different in quite some details.

The Monotype wedges used at the European continent are marked with an extra E behind the set-size: for instance: 5-12E, 1331-15E etc. When working with the E-wedges in the larger sizes the differences will increase even more.

Desktop publishing point 

Twelve points make up a pica, and six picas make an inch.

This specification was developed by John Warnock and Charles Geschke when they created Adobe PostScript. It was adopted by Apple Computer as the standard for the display resolution of the original Macintosh desktop computer and the print resolution for the LaserWriter printer.

In 1996, it was adopted by W3C for Cascading Stylesheets (CSS) where it was later related at a fixed 3:4 ratio to the pixel due to a general (but wrong) assumption of 96 pixel-per-inch screens.

Apple point 

Since the advent of high-density "Retina" screens with a much higher resolution than the original 72 dots per inch, Apple's programming environment  Xcode sizes GUI elements in points that are scaled automatically to a whole number of physical pixels in order to accommodate for screen size, pixel density and typical viewing distance. This Cocoa point is equivalent to the pixel px unit in CSS, the density-independent pixel dp on Android and the effective pixel epx or ep in Windows UWP.

Font sizes 

In lead typecasting, most font sizes commonly used in printing have conventional names that differ by country, language and the type of points used.

Desktop publishing software and word processors intended for office and personal use often have a list of suggested font sizes in their user interface, but they are not named and usually an arbitrary value can be entered manually. Microsoft Word, for instance, suggests every even size between 8 and 28 points and, additionally, 9, 11, 36, 48 and 72 points, i.e. the larger sizes equal 3, 4 and 6 picas. While most software nowadays defaults to DTP points, many allow other units, especially code-based systems like TeX and CSS.

See also 

 Pica (typography)
 Body height (typography)
 Traditional point-size names

References

Further reading 
 
 
 
 
 

Typography
Units of length
Customary units of measurement in the United States